In Norse mythology, Móði (anglicized Módi or Mothi) and Magni  are the sons of Thor. Their names translate to "Wrath" and "Mighty," respectively. Rudolf Simek states that, along with Thor's daughter Þrúðr ("Strength"), they embody their father's features.

Móði and Magni's descent from Thor is attested by the kennings "Móði's father" (faðir Móða, in Hymiskviða, 34) and "Magni's father" (faðir Magna, in Þórsdrápa and Hárbarðsljóð, 53). Snorri Sturluson confirms it (Gylfaginning, 53, Skáldskaparmál, 4). According to Skáldskaparmál (17) Magni is the son of Thor and the Jötunn Járnsaxa.

Poetic Edda
The two brothers are mentioned among the survivors of Ragnarök in the Poetic Edda Vafþrúðnismál:

Prose Edda
Apart from his role after Ragnarök, there is nothing we know about Móði but, in the Prose Edda book Skáldskaparmál, Magni plays a role in the myth of Thor's battle with the giant Hrungnir:
But the hammer Mjöllnir struck Hrungnir in the middle of the head, and smashed his skull into small crumbs, and he fell forward upon Thor, so that his foot lay over Thor's neck. Thjálfi struck at Mökkurkálfi, and he fell with little glory. Thereupon Thjálfi went over to Thor and would have lifted Hrungnir's foot off him, but could not find sufficient strength. Straightway all the Æsir came up, when they, learned that Thor was fallen, and would have lifted the foot from off him, and could do nothing. Then Magni came up, son of Thor and Járnsaxa: he was then three nights old; he cast the foot of Hrungnir off Thor, and spake: 'See how ill it is, father, that I came so late: I had struck this giant dead with my fist, methinks, if I had met with him.' Thor arose and welcomed his son, saying that he should surely become great; 'And I will give thee, he said, the horse Gold-Mane, which Hrungnir possessed.' Then Odin spake and said that Thor did wrong to give the good horse to the son of a giantess, and not to his father.

—Skáldskaparmál (17), Brodeur's translation
John Lindow draws a parallel between Magni and Odin's son Váli for they both have a giantess mother (Rindr for Váli) and achieve a feat at a very young age (Váli is only one day old when he kills Höðr, thus avenging Baldr's death).

In popular culture
 Móði and Magni are characters in Joanne Harris' Runemarks series.
 Móði and Magni are characters in Peter Madsen's Valhalla comics.
 Móði is the patron of the Berserker class in Mythic Entertainment's MMORPG, Dark Age of Camelot.
 Magni is the son of Thor and Enchantress in Marvel Comics.
 Modi (under the title of Mr. Morez) is the son of Thor and Hela in Marvel Comics's Ultimate Marvel imprint, as well as one of the main villains of the Divided We Fall arc of The Ultimates.
 The Modi and Magni are standalone DAC and amplifier products from Schiit Audio.
 Magni is the name of the Eldest Bronzebeard brother and ruler of the Dwarven kingdom of Khaz Modan in Blizzard Entertainment's hit MMORPG World of Warcraft
 Móði and Magni are Molly and Mardi, the daughters of Troy Overbrook (Thor) in the book Triple Moon by Melissa de la Cruz.
 Both Móði and Magni appear as antagonists in the 2018 video game God of War, voiced by Nolan North and Troy Baker respectively. Both follow their uncle Baldur in attempting to find and kill the protagonist Kratos. Magni is subsequently killed by Kratos later in a battle, with Modi fleeing. Modi is later beaten by an enraged Thor for allowing his brother to perish, and is later killed by Kratos' son Atreus.
 Magni and Modi appeared in Philippine TV Series Victor Magtanggol, they are played by Miguel Faustman and Pancho Magno, Magni's alter ego in the series is Sir Magnus, the owner of the  museum in Canada and the boss of Victor who will become his guide and mentor, while Modi is the arrogant and bloodlusted son of Thor and Magni's brother whose true purpose is to take Mjolnir for his own purpose and will become Victor's rival-ally in the battle.
 Magni's spirit is contained in a Class Card in the manga Fate/kaleid liner Prisma Illya. He is initially mistaken for Thor due to having inherited his Divine Core along with Mjolnir.
 Modi and Magni make brief appearances in the mobile game Is It Wrong to Try to Pick Up Girls in a Dungeon? Memoria Freese, as the Familia gods of the dwarf Dormul and the elf Luvis respectively.

See also
 Alexiares and Anicetus

Notes

References

 Lindow, John (2001). Norse Mythology: A Guide to the Gods, Heroes, Rituals, and Beliefs. New York: Oxford University Press, 2002. .
 Simek, Rudolf (1987). Dictionary of Northern Mythology. Translated by Angela Hall. Cambridge: D. S. Brewer, 1996. .

Æsir
Jötnar
Thor
Norse gods
Mythological duos
Brother duos

cs:Magni
da:Magni
da:Modi
el:Μόντι
fr:Magni
fr:Modi (dieu)
hr:Magni
hr:Modi
pl:Magni
fi:Modi
sv:Magne